Charles C. Bernstein (June 2, 1904 – April 29, 1976) was a justice of the Supreme Court of Arizona from January 5, 1959 to January 4, 1969. He served as chief justice from January 1962 to December 1963, and from January 1967 to December 1967.

Early life and education
Born in St. Louis, Missouri, Bernstein received an LL.B. from Southwestern University in Los Angeles in 1929, and was admitted to the Arizona Bar the following year.

Career
Bernstein served as Assistant Attorney General for Arizona from 1937 to 1939, and was a Delegate to the Democratic National Convention in 1940 and 1944. From 1946 to 1948, he was secretary of the Democratic State Central Committee.

In 1949 he was appointed as a Superior Court Judge in Arizona, becoming "the first Jewish judge in Arizona history", where he "achieved a national reputation as a juvenile court judge".

On May 5, 1954, Bernstein ruled that segregation of African-American students in Phoenix's Wilson Elementary School District was a violation of the 14th Amendment in Heard vs. Davis. At the time, the U.S. Supreme Court was preparing to decide Brown v. Board of Education, and the Supreme Court requested a copy of Judge Bernstein's opinion. On May 17, 1954, the Supreme Court announced its decision in Brown, that the doctrine of "separate, but equal" was unconstitutional.

Bernstein  was elected to the Supreme Court of Arizona in 1958, taking office the following January.

In 1967, Bernstein and Governor Jack Williams, called a citizens' conference on Arizona courts, which resulted in a permanent organization called The Citizens' Association on Arizona Courts, "whose primary goal was the establishment of a system for the merit selection of judges." In 1974, Arizona passed a constitutional amendment providing for the merit selection of judges, except superior court judges in counties with a population of 150,000 or more.

Bernstein died in Phoenix, Arizona.

Publications
 Disposition of Civil Appeals in the Supreme Court, 5 Ariz.L.Rev. 175 (Spring 1964).

References

External links
 Portrait
 1958 Campaign Photo, in El Sol

Justices of the Arizona Supreme Court
1904 births
1976 deaths
Southwestern Law School alumni
Lawyers from St. Louis
Chief Justices of the Arizona Supreme Court
20th-century American judges
20th-century American lawyers